Earl Thomas "Drip" Wilson (May 4, 1907 – November 25, 1950) was an American football center who played one season for the Cleveland Indians of the National Football League (NFL). 

Previously, Wilson played college football at St. Bonaventure.

Biography
Drip Wilson was born on May 4, 1907, in Sharon, Pennsylvania. He attended high school in Sharon before playing college football at St. Bonaventure. Fewer than fifteen people from St. Bonaventure ever played professionally. 

After playing at St. Bonaventure, he played professionally for one season with the Cleveland Indians of the National Football League (NFL); however, Wilson only made one appearance with the Indians, which folded the next season, ending his playing career. 

After playing professionally, he served as an assistant coach for Albion and Lawrence Park during four seasons. 

He then accepted a position with an industrial firm in Massillon, Ohio.

Death and interment
Wilson died on November 25, 1950, in Massillon. His cause of death was reportedly a heart attack caused by shoveling snow in his driveway. He was buried at St. Mary's Cemetery in Mercer County, Pennsylvania.

Notes

References

External links

1907 births
1950 deaths
St. Bonaventure Brown Indians football players
Cleveland Indians (NFL 1931) players
Players of American football from Pennsylvania
American football centers
Albion Britons football coaches